Abu Tommy (Russian: Абу Томми; born 13 October 1989 in Sierra Leone) is a Sierra Leonean retired footballer.

Career

Midway through 2010/11, Tommy signed for Sheriff Tiraspol, the most successful team in Moldova, saying that "Moldova has many opportunities, many games, and there are practically no gaps between them".

In 2012, he joined Tiraspol, another Moldovan club, but failed to make an appearance. After that, Tommy joined San Jose Earthquakes in the American top flight but again failed to make an appearance before playing for lower league side Atlanta Silverbacks.

During his professional career, he rubbed oil on himself before games in the belief that God would protect him.

References

External links
 Abu Tommy at Soccerway

Sierra Leonean footballers
Living people
Association football defenders
Association football midfielders
1989 births
FC Sheriff Tiraspol players
Moldovan Super Liga players
Sierra Leonean expatriate footballers
Expatriate footballers in Moldova
Sierra Leonean expatriate sportspeople in Moldova
Expatriate soccer players in the United States
Sierra Leonean expatriate sportspeople in the United States